Thomas Singas (born 5 September 1958) is a retired Greek football midfielder.

Honours 
 Greek Championship:
1984–85

References

1958 births
Living people
Greek footballers
Naoussa F.C. players
PAOK FC players
Apollon Pontou FC players
Panserraikos F.C. players
Super League Greece players
Association football midfielders
Footballers from Naousa, Imathia